Ondati Mixed Secondary School is a community run mixed secondary school in Ondati village, Ndhiwa Subcounty, Homabay County Nyanza, in western Kenya. It is located 3 km from NDHIWA SUKARI INDUSTRY, HOMABAY, KENYA. The school was established in 2009 as a girls-only school, catering for 100 girls, both day students and boarders. The school receives no government subsidy and is financed through a combination of student fees and income generated from a number of school enterprises. Since then, the school has expanded to become a mixed day secondary school, providing quality education to both boys and girls. 

The school's mission is to provide students with a quality education and to equip them with the knowledge, skills and values they need to be successful in life. The school's vision is to be a leading mixed secondary school in the region, renowned for its academic excellence and commitment to the overall development of its students.

The school offers a wide range of subjects, including mathematics, science, English, Kiswahili, history, geography, religious studies, and other elective subjects. The school also provides extracurricular activities such as sports, music, and drama to help students develop their talents and interests.

In the 2022 Kenya Certificate of Secondary Education (KCSE) examination, the school's results were as follows: 1 student scored a grade B, 3 students scored a grade C+, 4 students scored a grade C, 7 students scored a grade C-, 10 students scored a grade D+ and 5 students scored a grade D. 
In  Summary:

B   =  1

C+ =  3

C   =  4

C-  =  7

D+  = 10

D     = 5

Aggregate Mean=4.8 C-

These results indicate that Ondati Mixed Secondary School is a school that is dedicated to providing quality education to its students.

Overall, Ondati Mixed Secondary School is a great institution that is committed to providing quality education to the students in the community. The school's dedicated staff and excellent facilities make it an ideal learning environment for students looking to gain a quality education and to achieve their full potential.

External links 
 http://www.afid.org.uk/partners/ondati-secondary-school-girls/gallery

High schools and secondary schools in Kenya
Girls' schools in Kenya
Education in Nyanza Province
Educational institutions established in 2009
2009 establishments in Kenya